Neil Doherty may refer to:

 Neil Doherty (footballer) (born 2001), English footballer
 Neil Doherty (radio presenter) (fl. 2010s), Irish radio presenter
 Neil A. Doherty, American economist
 Neil Doherty, founding member of the band, The Tannahill Weavers
 Neil Doherty, a priest in the sexual abuse scandal in the Archdiocese of Miami